Manasquan is a borough in Monmouth County, in the U.S. state of New Jersey, on the Jersey Shore. As of the 2020 United States census, the borough's population was 5,938, an increase of 41 (+.7%) from the 2010 census count of 5,897, which in turn reflected a decline of 413 (−6.5%) from the 6,310 counted at the 2000 Census.

The borough's name is of Lenape Native American origin, deriving from "Mënàskunk" meaning "Place to Gather Grass or Reeds". Manasquan, Maniquan, Mannisquan, Manasquam, Squan, and Squan Village are variations on the original pronunciation and spelling. The borough's name has also been described as deriving from "Man-A-Squaw-Han" meaning "stream of the island of squaws", "an island with enclosure for squans", "island door" or "point" / "top". Manasquan, Maniquan, Mannisquan, Manasquam, Squan, and Squan Village are variations on the original pronunciation and spelling.

Manasquan was formed as a borough by an act of the New Jersey Legislature on December 30, 1887, from portions of Wall Township, based on the results of a referendum held the previous day.

New Jersey Monthly magazine ranked Manasquan as its 22nd best place to live in its 2008 rankings of the "Best Places To Live" in New Jersey.

Geography

According to the United States Census Bureau, the borough had a total area of 2.53 square miles (6.54 km2), including 1.38 square miles (3.57 km2) of land and 1.15 square miles (2.97 km2) of water (45.26%).

The borough borders the municipalities of Brielle, Sea Girt and Wall Township in Monmouth County; and Point Pleasant Beach in Ocean County. It has a humid subtropical climate (Cfa) and average monthly temperatures range from 32.3° F in January to 75.1° F in July.  The hardiness zone is 7a.

Demographics

2010 census

The Census Bureau's 2006–2010 American Community Survey showed that (in 2010 inflation-adjusted dollars) median household income was $87,525 (with a margin of error of +/− $21,227) and the median family income was $107,130 (+/− $13,653). Males had a median income of $98,408 (+/− $6,173) versus $56,250 (+/− $8,110) for females. The per capita income for the borough was $51,068 (+/− $8,350). About 3.1% of families and 5.0% of the population were below the poverty line, including 6.2% of those under age 18 and 4.7% of those age 65 or over.

2000 census
As of the 2000 United States census there were 6,310 people, 2,600 households, and 1,635 families residing in the borough. The population density was 4,579.6 people per square mile (1,765.4/km2). There were 3,531 housing units at an average density of 2,562.7 per square mile (987.9/km2). The racial makeup of the borough was 97.89% White, 0.41% Black, 0.11% Native American, 0.44% Asian, 0.48% from other races, and 0.67% from two or more races. Hispanic or Latino of any race were 4.48% of the population.

There were 2,600 households, out of which 29.5% had children under the age of 18 living with them, 49.3% were married couples living together, 10.3% had a female householder with no husband present, and 37.1% were non-families. 30.2% of all households were made up of individuals, and 11.5% had someone living alone who was 65 years of age or older. The average household size was 2.43 and the average family size was 3.06.

In the borough the population was spread out, with 23.8% under the age of 18, 6.6% from 18 to 24, 29.6% from 25 to 44, 25.1% from 45 to 64, and 14.9% who were 65 years of age or older. The median age was 39 years. For every 100 females, there were 96.9 males. For every 100 females age 18 and over, there were 95.4 males.

The median income for a household in the borough was $63,079, and the median income for a family was $73,670. Males had a median income of $52,368 versus $33,333 for females. The per capita income for the borough was $32,898. About 2.2% of families and 3.1% of the population were below the poverty line, including 2.8% of those under age 18 and 5.3% of those age 65 or over.

Government

Manasquan is governed under the Borough form of New Jersey municipal government, which is used in 218 municipalities (of the 564) statewide, making it the most common form of government in New Jersey. The governing body is comprised of a Mayor and a Borough Council, with all positions elected at-large on a partisan basis as part of the November general election. A Mayor is elected directly by the voters to a four-year term of office. The Borough Council consists of six members elected to serve three-year terms on a staggered basis, with two seats coming up for election each year in a three-year cycle. The Borough form of government used by Manasquan is a "weak mayor / strong council" government in which council members act as the legislative body with the mayor presiding at meetings and voting only in the event of a tie. The mayor can veto ordinances subject to an override by a two-thirds majority vote of the council. The mayor makes committee and liaison assignments for council members, and most appointments are made by the mayor with the advice and consent of the council.

, the Mayor of the Borough of Manasquan is Democrat Edward G. Donovan, whose term of office ends December 31, 2023. Members of the Borough Council are Brian Holly (R, 2024), Jeffrey K. Lee (D, 2023), Michael W. Mangan (D, 2023), Gregg Olivera (R, 2022), Richard E. Read (D, 2022) and Lori Triggiano (R, 2024) 

At the January 2017 reorganization meeting, Joseph Bossone was chosen on an interim basis to fill the three-year seat expiring in December 2019 that Owen McCarthy had been elected to in November 2016 until he resigned from office after being confirmed by the state senate to take a position as a Monmouth County judge; Bossone served on an interim basis until the November 2017 general election, when he was elected to serve the balance of the term of office.

In January 2016, the Borough Council appointed Richard Read to fill the council seat expiring in December 2016 that became vacant when Edward Donovan was sworn in as mayor.

Federal, state, and county representation
Manasquan is located in the 4th Congressional District and is part of New Jersey's 30th state legislative district. Prior to the 2011 reapportionment following the 2010 Census, Manasquan had been in the 10th state legislative district.

 

Monmouth County is governed by a Board of County Commissioners comprised of five members who are elected at-large to serve three year terms of office on a staggered basis, with either one or two seats up for election each year as part of the November general election. At an annual reorganization meeting held in the beginning of January, the board selects one of its members to serve as director and another as deputy director. , Monmouth County's Commissioners are
Commissioner Director Thomas A. Arnone (R, Neptune City, term as commissioner and as director ends December 31, 2022), 
Commissioner Deputy Director Susan M. Kiley (R, Hazlet Township, term as commissioner ends December 31, 2024; term as deputy commissioner director ends 2022),
Lillian G. Burry (R, Colts Neck Township, 2023),
Nick DiRocco (R, Wall Township, 2022), and 
Ross F. Licitra (R, Marlboro Township, 2023). 
Constitutional officers elected on a countywide basis are
County clerk Christine Giordano Hanlon (R, 2025; Ocean Township), 
Sheriff Shaun Golden (R, 2022; Howell Township) and 
Surrogate Rosemarie D. Peters (R, 2026; Middletown Township).

Politics
As of March 2011, there were a total of 4,277 registered voters in Manasquan, of which 956 (22.4%) were registered as Democrats, 1,271 (29.7%) were registered as Republicans and 2,047 (47.9%) were registered as Unaffiliated. There were three voters registered as Libertarians or Greens.

In the 2012 presidential election, Republican Mitt Romney received 59.7% of the vote (1,826 cast), ahead of Democrat Barack Obama with 39.3% (1,201 votes), and other candidates with 1.0% (32 votes), among the 3,080 ballots cast by the borough's 4,350 registered voters (21 ballots were spoiled), for a turnout of 70.8%. In the 2008 presidential election, Republican John McCain received 56.8% of the vote (1,943 cast), ahead of Democrat Barack Obama with 41.1% (1,406 votes) and other candidates with 1.0% (33 votes), among the 3,420 ballots cast by the borough's 4,384 registered voters, for a turnout of 78.0%. In the 2004 presidential election, Republican George W. Bush received 62.2% of the vote (2,136 ballots cast), outpolling Democrat John Kerry with 36.0% (1,237 votes) and other candidates with 1.0% (46 votes), among the 3,434 ballots cast by the borough's 4,452 registered voters, for a turnout percentage of 77.1.

In the 2013 gubernatorial election, Republican Chris Christie received 76.2% of the vote (1,872 cast), ahead of Democrat Barbara Buono with 22.3% (549 votes), and other candidates with 1.5% (36 votes), among the 2,504 ballots cast by the borough's 4,378 registered voters (47 ballots were spoiled), for a turnout of 57.2%. In the 2009 gubernatorial election, Republican Chris Christie received 65.6% of the vote (1,695 ballots cast), ahead of Democrat Jon Corzine with 26.1% (674 votes), Independent Chris Daggett with 6.8% (175 votes) and other candidates with 0.9% (23 votes), among the 2,584 ballots cast by the borough's 4,269 registered voters, yielding a 60.5% turnout.

Community
Due to its location bordering the Atlantic Ocean, the population of Manasquan increases dramatically in the summer months as tourists flock to the beach.

The Manasquan Inlet provides surfers with waves that are corralled, refracted and enlarged by the jetty protruding out into the Atlantic Ocean. The Manasquan Inlet, reopened in 1931, is the northern terminus of the inland portion of the Intracoastal Waterway.

Manasquan has a downtown area with many small businesses. Algonquin Arts Theatre has shows and movies that play throughout the year.  It is a historic 540-seat theatre, built in 1938 as a movie house but converted to a professional live performance space in May 1994.

The demolition of traditional beach bungalows and their replacement with much larger single-family dwellings has helped turn Manasquan into a year-round community. The decrease in tourism and rise in residency can be attributed to the decline of once popular tourist destinations. Manasquan no longer has a 24-hour diner or a miniature golf course, and has lost many of the bars once located in its borders. During the summer months, the local bar and party scene overwhelm the area between Brielle Road and Main Street from the bridges to the ocean, especially with local bars—Leggetts and The Osprey—contributing greatly to the amount of party goers in the town.

The Firemans' Fair occurs every July/August. The fair is the largest source of funds for Manasquan Volunteer Engine Company #2 and dates back to 1974. Though it was on a decade-long hiatus until the late 1990s, the five day-long festivities in 2011 were expected to draw 30,000 attendees.

Until 2010, Manasquan was home to the Cat Fanciers' Association (CFA), the largest registry of pedigreed cats in the world.

Transportation

Roads and highways

Route 71 is the most significant highway running directly through the borough. The Garden State Parkway is the nearest major highway.

Public transportation
NJ Transit offers rail service at the Manasquan station on the North Jersey Coast Line. Passengers can travel south to Point Pleasant Beach and Bay Head or north to points such as Belmar, Long Branch, Newark, Hoboken Terminal and Penn Station in Midtown Manhattan.

NJ Transit provides bus transportation between Manasquan and Philadelphia on the 317 route and local service on the 830 route.

Education
The Manasquan Public Schools serves students from kindergarten through twelfth grade. As of the 2018–19 school year, the district, comprised of two schools, had an enrollment of 1,548 students and 138.9 classroom teachers (on an FTE basis), for a student–teacher ratio of 11.1:1. Schools in the district (with 2018–19 enrollment data from the National Center for Education Statistics) are 
Manasquan Elementary School with 545 students in grades K–8 and 
Manasquan High School with 969 students in grades 9–12. In addition to students from Manasquan, the district's high school also serves public school students from Avon-by-the-Sea, Belmar, Brielle, Lake Como, Sea Girt, Spring Lake, and Spring Lake Heights, who attend Manasquan High School as part of sending/receiving relationships with their respective districts. The two Manasquan public school buildings are across from each other on Broad Street, with Board of Education offices next door to the high school.

The Roman Catholic-affiliated St. Denis School served youth from pre-school through 8th grade under the auspices of the Roman Catholic Diocese of Trenton. In 2014, the diocese announced that the school was closing at the end of the 2014–2015 school year, as fewer students were attending, with enrollment having fallen from a peak of nearly 400 in the 1970s to 107 in 2014.

Climate

According to the Köppen climate classification system, Manasquan, New Jersey has a humid subtropical climate (Cfa). Cfa climates are characterized by all months having an average mean temperature > 32.0 °F (> 0.0 °C), at least four months with an average mean temperature ≥ 50.0 °F (≥ 10.0 °C), at least one month with an average mean temperature ≥ 71.6 °F (≥ 22.0 °C) and no significant precipitation difference between seasons. During the summer months at Manasquan, a cooling afternoon  sea breeze is present on most days, but episodes of extreme heat and humidity can occur with heat index values ≥ 95 °F (≥ 35 °C). On average, the wettest month of the year is July which corresponds with the annual peak in thunderstorm activity. During the winter months, episodes of extreme cold and wind can occur with wind chill values < 0 °F (< −18 °C). The plant hardiness zone at Manasquan Beach is 7a with an average annual extreme minimum air temperature of 3.6 °F (−15.8 °C).

Ecology
According to the A. W. Kuchler U.S. potential natural vegetation types, Manasquan, New Jersey would have an Appalachian Oak (104) vegetation type with an Eastern Hardwood Forest (25) vegetation form.

Notable people

People who were born in, residents of, or otherwise closely associated with Manasquan include:

 Lewis Benson (1906–1986), expert on the writings of George Fox
 Doris Burke (born 1965), ESPN basketball analyst
 Frank J. Dodd (1938–2010), businessman and politician who served as President of the New Jersey Senate from 1974 to 1975
 Glenn Hedden (born 1950), former head football coach and athletic director at Kean University
 Alexis Krauss (born 1985), singer, songwriter, and front-woman of the noise pop duo Sleigh Bells
 Jack Nicholson (born 1937), actor, director and writer
 Shayne Pospisil (born 1985), snowboarder
 Christie Rampone (born 1975), captain of the United States women's national soccer team
 Alex Skuby (born 1972), actor best known for appearing on King of Queens
 Hal Thompson (1922–2006), football player who played for two seasons in the NFL for the Brooklyn Dodgers
 Gary S. Kessler (born 1949), first Manasquan High School graduate to attend the University of Notre Dame. Gary has practiced law in Dallas, TX for over 40 years and is famously known for originating the “Kessler Drill” at Manasquan Highschool, which was coined when he was caught skipping football practice (Sunday film) to surf the inlet. To have his spot on the roster restored, his punishment was tackling the whole team twice-the “Kessler Drill.”

References

External links

Borough of Manasquan official website
Manasquan Public Schools

School Data for the Manasquan Public Schools, National Center for Education Statistics
Manasquan Chamber of Commerce

Atlantic View Cemetery & Mausoleum – Manasquan, NJ

 
1887 establishments in New Jersey
Borough form of New Jersey government
Boroughs in Monmouth County, New Jersey
Jersey Shore communities in Monmouth County
Populated places established in 1887